Wolfgang Kuhlmann (born 19 October 1939) is a German philosopher and representative of the discourse ethics.

Academic career 
Born in Kiel, Kuhlmann, who received his doctorate in 1974, and habilitated in 1983, is a student of Karl-Otto Apel and a colleague of Peter Rohs. He then worked as a private lecturer in philosophy at the Goethe University in Frankfurt and from 1985 to 1992 as managing director and editor of the publication series in the Forum für Philosophie in Bad Homburg. In 1989 Kuhlmann became full professor at the University of Frankfurt and in 1992 a professor at the University of Erfurt. From 1993 to 2005 Kuhlmann taught at the RWTH Aachen University.

Especially for discourse ethics in the sense of Karl-Otto Apel, Wolfgang Kuhlmann claims a final justification.

Work 
 Reflexion und kommunikative Erfahrung. Suhrkamp Verlag, Frankfurt 1975.
 Reflexive Letztbegründung. Untersuchungen zur Transzendentalpragmatik. Alber Verlag, Freiburg/Munich 1985.
 Kant und die Transzendentalpragmatik. Verlag Königshausen & Neumann, Würzburg 1992.
 Sprachphilosophie, Hermeneutik, Ethik. Studien zur Transzendentalpragmatik. Verlag Königshausen & Neumann, Würzburg 1992.
 Moralität und Sittlichkeit. Suhrkamp Verlag, Frankfurt, 1986.
 Beiträge zur Diskursethik. Studien zur Transzendentalpragmatik. Verlag Königshausen & Neumann, Würzburg 2007.
 Unhintergehbarkeit. Studien zur Transzendentalpragmatik. Verlag Königshausen & Neumann, Würzburg 2010.

Literature 
 Wulf Kellerwessel among others (ed.): Diskurs und Reflexion: Wolfgang Kuhlmann zum 65. Geburtstag. Verlag Königshausen & Neumann, Würzburg 2005.

References

External links 
 
 Bibliography

20th-century German philosophers
Academic staff of Goethe University Frankfurt
Academic staff of the University of Erfurt
Academic staff of RWTH Aachen University
1939 births
Living people
Writers from Kiel